Brayan Santiago Rodallegas Carvajal (born 15 November 1997) is a Colombian weightlifter, Pan American Champion and Pan American Games Champion competing in the 77 kg and 85 kg categories until 2018 and 89 kg and 81 kg starting in 2018 after the International Weightlifting Federation reorganized the categories.

Career
In 2019, he competed at the Pan American Weightlifting Championships in the 81 kg category. He swept gold medals in all lifts, setting Pan American Records in each. Later in 2019 he competed at the 2019 Pan American Games in the 81 kg category, winning a gold medal and setting two Pan American Records in the snatch, with successful lifts of 163 kg and 167 kg.

In 2021, he competed at the 2020 Summer Olympics in the 81 kg.

He won the gold medal in his event at the 2022 Pan American Weightlifting Championships held in Bogotá, Colombia. He also set new Panamerican records in the Snatch, the Clean & Jerk and Total results.

He won the silver medal in the men's 96kg event at the 2022 South American Games held in Asunción, Paraguay. He won the silver medal in the men's 89kg event at the 2022 World Weightlifting Championships held in Bogotá, Colombia.

Major results

References

External links

Living people
1997 births
Colombian male weightlifters
World Weightlifting Championships medalists
Pan American Games medalists in weightlifting
Pan American Games gold medalists for Colombia
Weightlifters at the 2019 Pan American Games
Medalists at the 2019 Pan American Games
Pan American Weightlifting Championships medalists
Weightlifters at the 2020 Summer Olympics
People from Villavicencio
Olympic weightlifters of Colombia
South American Games silver medalists for Colombia
South American Games medalists in weightlifting
Competitors at the 2018 South American Games
Competitors at the 2022 South American Games
21st-century Colombian people